The 1998 FIA Formula One World Championship was the 52nd season of FIA Formula One motor racing. It featured the 1998 Formula One World Championship for Drivers and the 1998 Formula One World Championship for Constructors, which were contested concurrently over a sixteen-race series that commenced on 8 March and ended on 1 November. Finland's Mika Häkkinen won his first Drivers' Championship, and McLaren-Mercedes won the Constructors' Championship, the first for the McLaren team since .

The season saw a large shuffling of the pecking order, with McLaren-Mercedes emerging as the fastest constructor. Häkkinen won four of the first six races to establish a clear lead in the Drivers' Championship, but a strong mid-season resurgence from Michael Schumacher and Ferrari, including five wins, put the German driver level on points with Häkkinen with two races remaining. Häkkinen then won the Luxembourg Grand Prix from Schumacher to take a four-point lead into the season finale in Japan. There, Schumacher took pole position only to stall on the grid and then suffer a puncture, leaving Häkkinen to win the race and the championship. Even so, Häkkinen would have won on countback through more second places had Schumacher won the race assuming the Finn had finished second. Häkkinen's teammate David Coulthard finished third overall with Schumacher's teammate Eddie Irvine fourth, while McLaren's final margin over Ferrari in the Constructors' Championship was 23 points.

With the factory withdrawal of Renault and the departure of designer Adrian Newey to McLaren, the Williams team and Jacques Villeneuve were unable to defend their respective championships. Williams ultimately suffered their first winless season since , though they still finished third in the Constructors' Championship. The Benetton team also failed to win a race in 1998, despite young Italian Giancarlo Fisichella showing promise. Jordan, led by former champion Damon Hill, failed to score a point in the first half of the season, but a strong resurgence in the second half - including Hill taking the team's first F1 victory in wet conditions in Belgium with teammate Ralf Schumacher second - enabled them to finish fourth in the Constructors' Championship. 1998 was also the final season for the former champion Tyrrell team, following its sale by Ken Tyrrell to British American Tobacco.

, this is the most recent Constructors' Championship for McLaren.

Teams and drivers
The following teams and drivers competed in the 1998 FIA Formula One World Championship.

† All engines were 3.0 litre, V10 configuration.

Calendar

Calendar changes
The Portuguese Grand Prix was originally scheduled near the end of the season, to be held at the Estoril circuit on 11 October. The race was cancelled as the government refused to pay for the required safety upgrades. The cancellation left a gap of five weeks to the final race in Japan.

Off-season changes
As a result, the two teams running Renault engines were forced to source alternative suppliers. Williams opted to run engines supplied by Mecachrome, who were working with Renault to develop the most recent iteration of their RS9 engine rebadged with the Mecachrome name. Benetton sourced a similar rebadged Renault engine from Playlife. Neither Williams nor Benetton were competitive to the same level as in previous seasons. They would not supply engines to other competing teams again until . The Prost and Jordan teams swapped their engine suppliers from 1997: Prost now used Peugeot, whilst Jordan used Mugen-Honda.

The 1998 season brought about two significant technical changes to reduce cornering speeds and aid overtaking. The second change was the introduction of grooved tyres to replace slicks (the last time Formula One featured grooved dry tyres was in 1970): the front tyres had three grooves, with four on the rear tyres. For 1998, both McLaren and Benetton switched from Goodyear to Bridgestone tyres, as the Japanese manufacturer expanded to work with six of the eleven teams in their second year competing in the sport. This would result in the two teams who became principal championship protagonists working with different tyre manufacturers. The two top teams from 1997, Williams and Ferrari, opted to retain Goodyear tyres.

As Ford-Cosworth/Zetec and Hart switched to V10 engines respectively, all Formula One entrants began using the mandated 3.0-litre V10 naturally-aspirated engines for the first time ever.

The "I"-shaped cameras mounted on top of the engine covers, seen on selected cars from 1995 to 1997, were made mandatory for each car in 1998, and changed to a more aerodynamic "T"-shaped camera; this design has remained largely unchanged since.

Mid-season technical changes
"X wings", a pair of tall aerodynamic appendages mounted at the front of each sidepod and first seen on the Tyrrell 025 in 1997, were banned before the Spanish Grand Prix. The teams that used them in 1998 were Ferrari, Jordan, Prost, Sauber, and Tyrrell.

Driver changes
Gerhard Berger retired at the end of 1997 after fourteen years in F1, leaving a vacant seat at Benetton. The team also opted not to renew Jean Alesi's contract, so the Frenchman signed a two-year deal to join Johnny Herbert at Sauber. As their replacements, Benetton signed Giancarlo Fisichella from Jordan, and Alexander Wurz, who had substituted for Berger for three races (including one podium finish) in 1997 when his fellow Austrian was ill.

Jordan replaced Fisichella by signing 1996 World Champion Damon Hill from Arrows to partner Ralf Schumacher. To fill his seat, Arrows secured the services of Tyrrell's Mika Salo alongside Pedro Diniz. Tyrrell also parted ways with Jos Verstappen in the off-season, despite Ken Tyrrell wanting him to stay. However, new owners British American Tobacco preferred to hire Brazilian Ricardo Rosset, who had briefly raced for the now-defunct Lola team in 1997. They promoted test driver Toranosuke Takagi to fill the second seat. Verstappen returned to F1 midway through 1998 with Stewart, while Lola's other driver, Vincenzo Sospiri, instead found a home in the IndyCar Series.

Prost retained Olivier Panis, but dropped second driver Shinji Nakano and replaced him with Jarno Trulli. Trulli had started 1997 with Minardi but then substituted for Panis when he broke his leg at the Canadian Grand Prix. Meanwhile, Nakano joined Trulli's old team, Minardi, to replace his retiring countryman Ukyo Katayama. He was partnered by rookie Esteban Tuero, who was promoted from a testing role as he was preferred to the outgoing Tarso Marques. Marques would eventually return to F1 in 2001, also with Minardi.

Williams (Jacques Villeneuve and Heinz-Harald Frentzen), Ferrari (Michael Schumacher and Eddie Irvine), McLaren (David Coulthard and Mika Häkkinen) and Stewart (Rubens Barrichello and Jan Magnussen) all retained their 1997 driver line-ups.

Mid-season driver changes
The only mid-season change was at Stewart. Jan Magnussen was dropped after the Canadian Grand Prix following a series of underwhelming performances (including crashing into and eliminating his teammate Rubens Barrichello on lap 1 at Imola) and replaced by Jos Verstappen, who had been out of a drive since leaving Tyrrell at the end of 1997.

Season summary
When the season commenced, it was immediately clear that McLaren had adapted to the new rule changes best, with their drivers locking out the front row of the grid at the opening race of the season in Australia, both more than half a second clear of –95 world champion Michael Schumacher's Ferrari. Mika Häkkinen went on to take victory in controversial circumstances after teammate David Coulthard moved over to allow him to pass in the closing laps, honouring a gentlemen's agreement that the driver leading at the first corner would win the race. Coulthard went on to finish second. This result was repeated in Brazil, although once again controversy was not far away, this time off the track: a protest was raised about a controversial braking system on the McLaren which was suggested to allow the drivers to brake front and rear wheels independently, contravening the rules. McLaren agreed not to run the system, but remained dominant in the race. With Goodyear making steps forward before Argentina, Schumacher was able to take his first win of the season, with teammate Eddie Irvine in third. Häkkinen finished a distant second, but Coulthard only managed sixth after he was tipped into a spin early in the race by Schumacher.

Coulthard bounced back in Imola by gaining pole position and winning the race, which would be his lone win of the season, ahead of Schumacher and Irvine. Häkkinen suffered his first retirement of the season due to a gearbox failure. The progress made by Goodyear enabled Ferrari to excel on these twisty circuits. In Spain, however, the fast corners favoured McLaren and again they raced away to another 1–2 finish led by Häkkinen. A further win for Häkkinen in Monaco gave him a seventeen-point lead over Coulthard with Schumacher a further five points behind.

Schumacher fought back to win the next three races, while mistakes and mechanical failures cost both Häkkinen and Coulthard points. After the British Grand Prix, Schumacher had closed the gap to Häkkinen to just two points, while Coulthard was 26 points behind his teammate and looking unlikely to be able to fight for the championship. Consecutive wins in Austria and Germany for Häkkinen proved that McLaren still had the strongest car, but a strategic master stroke in Hungary allowed Schumacher to take the win (with Häkkinen only managing sixth) and close the championship gap to just seven points.

The start of a typically rain-filled Belgian Grand Prix saw one of the worst accidents in Formula One history, with over half the cars on the grid crashing into each other after the first corner; four of those drivers were unable to take the restart almost an hour later due to lack of spare cars. An action-packed race saw Häkkinen spin out into retirement at the restart after colliding with the Sauber of Johnny Herbert. This allowed Schumacher to lead comfortably before crashing into Coulthard when trying to lap his McLaren. The path was then clear for  world champion Damon Hill to take Jordan's first ever win, followed by teammate Ralf Schumacher in second.

Michael Schumacher bounced back to take a surprise victory in Italy, having initially outraced Häkkinen, who ended up finishing only fourth after brake problems sent him into two spins. The championship was now level with two races to go, with the result also bringing Ferrari back into contention for the World Constructors' Championship, being just ten points behind. For the next race at the Nürburgring, Häkkinen managed to beat Schumacher in a straight fight. The season concluded in Japan, where Häkkinen won easily without any challenge from Schumacher, who stalled on the grid and retired from a blown tyre later in the race. This gave Häkkinen his first world championship and McLaren their eighth Constructors' Championship. Williams, 1997 Constructors' Champion, had a disappointing season overall, with only two podium finishes for reigning Drivers' Champion Jacques Villeneuve and one for Heinz-Harald Frentzen. However, in Japan they managed to secure third in the Constructors' Championship, ahead of Jordan and Benetton.

Results and standings

Grands Prix

Scoring system

Points were awarded to the top six finishers in each race as follows:

World Drivers' Championship standings

Notes:
 – Driver did not finish the Grand Prix but was classified, as he completed more than 90% of the race distance.

World Constructors' Championship standings

Notes:
 – Driver did not finish the Grand Prix but was classified, as he completed more than 90% of the race distance.

Notes

References

External links

formula1.com – 1998 official driver standings (archived)
formula1.com – 1998 official team standings (archived)
1998 Formula One Technical Regulations (archived)

Formula One seasons
 
Formula 1